The 2017 Korean FA Cup, known as the 2017 KEB Hana Bank FA Cup, was the 22nd edition of the Korean FA Cup. The champions Ulsan Hyundai qualified for the group stage of the 2018 AFC Champions League. This edition introduced video assistant referee (VAR) system for the first time in Korean FA Cup history, using in the semi-finals and the final.

Qualifying rounds

First round

Second round

Third round

Final rounds

Bracket

Round of 32

Round of 16

Quarter-finals

Semi-finals

Final

See also
2017 in South Korean football
2017 K League Classic
2017 K League Challenge
2017 Korea National League
2017 K3 League Advanced
2017 K3 League Basic

References

External links
Official website
Korean FA Cup at Soccerway
Regulations at KFA 

Korean FA Cup seasons